Fossarus erythraoensis is a species of sea snail, a marine gastropod mollusk in the family Planaxidae.

WoRMS indicates this species as a taxon inquirendum.

Description

Distribution
This species occurs in the Red Sea.

References

 P. (1986). Red Sea Invertebrates. Immel Publishing, London. 224 pp.

Planaxidae